Mari Nakaga (仲嘉 真理, born  in Okinawa) was a Japanese female weightlifter, competing in the 58 kg category and representing Japan at international competitions.

She participated at the 2000 Summer Olympics in the 53 kg event. She competed at world championships, most recently at the 2002 World Weightlifting Championships.

Major results

References

External links
 
http://slam.canoe.com/2000GamesWeightlifting/sep18_yan.html
http://www.todor66.com/weightlifting/World/2002/Women_under_58kg.html
http://www.gettyimages.com/detail/news-photo/mari-nakaga-of-japan-in-action-during-the-womens-news-photo/1184907#sep-2000-mari-nakaga-of-japan-in-action-during-the-womens-during-day-picture-id1184907

1975 births
Living people
Japanese female weightlifters
Weightlifters at the 2000 Summer Olympics
Olympic weightlifters of Japan
Place of birth missing (living people)
Weightlifters at the 1998 Asian Games
Weightlifters at the 2002 Asian Games
Asian Games competitors for Japan
People from Okinawa Prefecture